Bethel Baptist Church is a historic Baptist church building at 801 Andrews in the Fourth Ward, Houston, Texas.

The Late Gothic Revival building was constructed in 1923 and added to the National Register of Historic Places in 1998.

History
The original Bethel Church building was constructed in 1889 as a haven for former slaves and was entirely constructed of wood. Built by the Reverend Jack Yates, the plot was located in Houston's Freedmantown district. The original structure was destroyed in the Great Storm of 1900. Between 1900 and 1920, a second church structure was erected on top of the remains but it too was later destroyed.  Twenty three years later, the church was reconstructed for a third and final time.

In 1997, the last church service was held in the building after which it was abandoned.

On January 24, 2005, a fire destroyed the interior of the church, leaving only the exterior brickwork intact."The roof, all the interior and even the church's back wall had been destroyed; all that was left were three walls, some concrete supports and the concrete floor."

In 2009, the church was sold to the City of Houston. Soon thereafter, the city erected steel supports and a concrete floor to preserve the building.

The city purchased the church, one of the oldest in Houston, for $350,000 of special tax increment re-investment zone money. The city planned for the restoration project to take two years. Prior to the city's purchase of the church, area residents feared that the church ruins would be demolished to make room for more townhouses. Since the fire occurred, the Bethel Missionary Baptist Church congregation relocated to a new building. Pastor Robert Robertson, the leader of the church, supported the city's purchase and restoration of the church facility.

References

Churches in Houston
Baptist churches in Texas
Churches completed in 1923
Churches on the National Register of Historic Places in Texas
Gothic Revival church buildings in Texas
1923 establishments in Texas
National Register of Historic Places in Houston
Fourth Ward, Houston